In 1983, Al Alvarez published, The Biggest Game in Town, a book detailing the 1981 World Series of Poker event.  The first book of its kind, it described the world of professional poker players and the World Series of Poker. It is credited with beginning the genre of poker literature and with bringing Texas Hold'em (and poker generally), for the first time, to a wider audience.

References 

1983 non-fiction books
Poker books
André Deutsch books